Dorina Catineanu (born 20 January 1954) is a Romanian female former track and field athlete who competed in the long jump.

She was the gold medallist in the event at the 1975 European Athletics Indoor Championships – the second Romanian to win that title after Viorica Viscopoleanu. She was a silver medallist at the 1975 World University Championships. She also represented her country at the 1974 European Athletics Championships, competing in the heats only.

International competitions

See also
List of European Athletics Indoor Championships medalists (women)

References

Living people
1954 births
Romanian female long jumpers
Universiade medalists in athletics (track and field)
Universiade silver medalists for Romania
Medalists at the 1975 Summer Universiade